There are two species of skink  named spotted broad-blazed slider:
 Lerista uniduo
 Lerista stictopleura